Sana'y Wala Nang Wakas  (International title: Timeless / ) is a Philippine primetime soap opera aired by ABS-CBN that premiered on May 19, 2003, and ended on July 9, 2004. It is a love story of two star-crossed lovers who suffer for their parents' long forgotten sins. Christian and Ara battle the odd twists and turns of fate in the hopes of protecting a love that withstands the test of time. The series was headlined by Jericho Rosales, Kristine Hermosa, Diether Ocampo and Angelika Dela Cruz.

The series ran for two seasons in the second to final season Diether Ocampo and Angelika Dela Cruz became new regular cast members leaning in for a new plot twist revolving around Dela Cruz and Rosales' Character and Ocampo and Hermosa's characters on the soap.

This was the first television series in the Philippines to have the finale to choose the character Ara’s Hermosa’s character to choose who she will marry through text message votes through The Filipino Channel and ABS-CBN Christian (Rosales) or  Leo (Ocampo) both finale prediction episodes aired the same week with The Christian and Arabella wedding aired on Friday and Sunday night 

Desiree Del Valle’s character was introduced in the mid first and second season after she finished the finale of her successful soap “Bituin” in 2003

Plot
Falling victim to a freak accident on a ship sailing, Christian (Jericho Rosales) and Ara (Kristine Hermosa) get trapped in an isolated island and fell in love.  Reality stepped in when they were rescued and had to go back to their own lives.  She felt the difference in their social status.  Despite all odds, he promised his eternal love for Ara, unaware of her family's involvement in his painful past.

Upon discovering the truth Christian was driven with anger, which made Ara and her family decided to escape his revenge.  This tragic journey leads Ara to meet a rich and carefree painter, Leo (Diether Ocampo).  She learned to bury things as they are.  And Leo's unconditional love helped her to start anew.  Christian, on the other hand, finds comfort with kindhearted Mary Ann (Angelika dela Cruz), an amusing friend who slowly wins Christian's trust and affection.

When romance seems perfect for estranged lovers, fate stepped in and brought Christian back into Ara's life.  Ara must now confront her unfinished business with Christian...

While stranded again on the same island they are captured by the rebels and Christian is tortured by the rebels. They are rescued by Leo and they escape with help from a disgruntled rebel. Christian is then shot in the leg just as Leo's brother Ramon and the military arrives to save them. Ara is then fatally shot in the chest by the rebel leader. The rebel leader is then shot to death by the military in response.

What lies beneath their intertwined past?  Will Christian and Ara's romance bind together again?

Cast and characters

Main cast
 Jericho Rosales as Christian Soriano - Orphaned at a young age, he is groomed to handle the family's vast powerful companies.  He falls in love with Ara, not knowing that she holds a past that could ruin them altogether.
 Kristine Hermosa as Arabella Grace Garcia/Grace Gonzales - She also happens to be the daughter of Elizabeth who grows up without knowing the love of her mother.  She falls in love with Christian, not knowing that this will cause her great pain.
 Diether Ocampo as Leonardo Madrigal III - Leo is the eldest grandson of Don Marcelo, a wealthy plantation owner.  And Ramon is his younger brother. They are a product of a broken family since their mother left them at an early age to marry someone else in America.  Both brothers were left under the care of Don Marcelo.  Leo is also an artist and would rather follow his passion on arts and music rather than manage the hacienda.  He is a loving grandson, and is brave enough to fight for what he believes in or for the woman he would eventually fall in love with. 
 Angelika dela Cruz as Mary Ann Santos -  Mary Ann is a very cheerful person.  Everyone around her is affected by her gaiety.  In spite of her troubled past.  Her mother was a GRO, who married a man who would do anything for money even if meant, “selling” his stepdaughter.  Having escaped her past, she is determined to fulfill her dream of becoming a recording artist.  Brave and street smart, in spite of not being able to finish her studies, she would do everything to attain her goals and would do everything for the man she would eventually fall in love with.

Supporting cast
 Gloria Romero as Doña Valeria Valencia
 Cherry Pie Picache as Elizabeth "Yvette" Valencia
 Joel Torre as Anton Garcia
 Caridad Sanchez as Choleng
 Marvin Agustin as Newton
 Kaye Abad as Shane Diwata
 Desiree del Valle as Francine
 Luis Alandy as Ramon Madrigal
 Roderick Paulate as Truman
 Gary Estrada as Richard Valencia
 Serena Dalrymple as Rain Soriano
 Julia Clarete as Denise
 Karlo Enriquez as Young Nicanor
 Troy Martino as Shane's Father
 Kimberly Diaz as Einstein's Wife
 Carla Humphries as Christian's Secretary

Special guest cast and characters
 Jane Oineza as young Arabella Grace Garcia/Grace Gonzales
 John Manalo as young Christian Soriano
 Kathryn Bernardo as young Shane Diwata
 Joshua Dionisio as young Leonardo Madrigal II
 Ilonah Jean as Rhodora Soriano
 Bong Regala as Emilio Soriano
 Bon Vibar as Nicanor Soriano
 Nina Ricci Alagao as Bettina
 Minnie Aguilar as Shane's Mother
 Ward Luarca as Orly
 Marithez Samson as Lucy
 Cholo Escaño as Einstein
 Crispin Pineda as Young Orly
 Tin Arnaldo as Young Valeria
 Boy Abunda as himself
 Karlina Bayot as Socorro Soriano
 Kris Aquino as herself
 Suzette Ranillo as Jake
 Robby Mananquil as Perry
 Chinggoy Alonzo as Don Marcelo Madrigal
 Teresa Garcia
 Khalila Aguiluz
 Vangie Labalan
 Errol Dionisio †
 Efren Reyes Jr.
 Brandon Gepfer as Mando Leandro
 Niña de Sagun

Soundtrack
Sana'y Wala Nang Wakas - performed by Jessa Zaragoza
Maybe - performed by King
Alam Kong Di Ako, Okey Lang - performed by Angelika dela Cruz
Habang May Buhay - performed by Angelika dela Cruz
Kailan Ka Darating? - performed by Angelika dela Cruz
Bukas Na Lang Kita Mamahalin - performed by Angelika dela Cruz
I Believe in You and Me - performed by Angelika dela Cruz and Jericho Rosales
Looking Through the Eyes of Love - performed by Angelika dela Cruz
Kung Ako na lang Sana - performed by Angelika dela Cruz
Special Memory - performed by Kaye Abad
You've Made Me Stronger - performed by Kaye Abad
Stop Think - performed by Kaye Abad

Production credits
 Directors: Jerome Chavez-Pobocan and FM Reyes
 Creative Manager: Ricardo Lee
 Head Writer: Henry King Quitain
 Episode Writers: Ma. Regina Amigo, Dindo Perez, Aileen Sempio-Viray, Francis Passion
 Contributing Writers: Denise O'Hara, Mel Francis Santos, Jarell Serencio
 Executive Producers: Des de Guzman, Charo Santos-Concio, and Malou Santos
 Supervising Producer: Anna Goma
 Assistant Director:

Reception
Sana'y Wala Nang Wakas was considered as one of the best soap operas in the Philippine TV history by most of the critics and audiences. Its highest rating was 49.3%, while the lowest was 38.7%. Its overall ratings was 40.4%.

Remake
A Malaysian remake of the series, titled Cinta Tiada Ganti premiered from July 10, 2018, to November 26, 2018, on Astro Prima and Astro Maya HD. Starring Aedy Ashraf and Nelydia Senrose.

See also
 List of programs aired by ABS-CBN
 List of programs broadcast by ABS-CBN
 List of ABS-CBN drama series

References

External links
 

ABS-CBN drama series
2003 Philippine television series debuts
2004 Philippine television series endings
Television series by Star Creatives
Filipino-language television shows
Television shows filmed in the Philippines